Marwa Abidi (born 1 January 1990) is a Tunisian footballer who plays as a forward. She has been a member of the Tunisia women's national team.

Club career
Abidi has played for AS Banque de l'Habitat in Tunisia and for Tremblay in France.

International career
Abidi capped for Tunisia at senior level during the 2009 UNAF Women's Tournament.

International goals
Scores and results list Tunisia goal tally first

See also
List of Tunisia women's international footballers

References

External links

1990 births
Living people
People from Tunis Governorate
Tunisian women's footballers
Women's association football forwards
Tunisia women's international footballers
Tunisian expatriate footballers
Tunisian expatriate sportspeople in France
Expatriate women's footballers in France